The AVIC Leadair AG300, previously called Primus 150, built by the China Aviation Industry General Aircraft, is a development of the Epic LT aircraft built using the international rights to Epic Aircraft bought in bankruptcy in 2010. As part of the settlement, Epic retained its rights for American construction and support of its aircraft, creating two divergent lines.

Design and development

China Aviation Industry General Aircraft (CAIGA) began the process of developing the Epic LT into the Primus 150 for commercial construction, with program first started in November 2011. Its maiden flight was successfully completed on July 5, 2014, and Chinese state certification was received in the following year. Three enterprises have signed letters of intent to purchase the aircraft at a unit price of two million US dollars, under the new name Leadair AG300. The general designer is Mr. Xiong Xianpeng (熊贤鹏). Currently, Leadair AG300 is the fastest flying single-engine, propeller driven general aviation aircraft in China. The aircraft is a five-seat low-wing tricycle-gear pressurized turboprop.

Specifications (Primus 150)

See also

References

Epic aircraft
2010s Chinese civil utility aircraft
Single-engined tractor aircraft
Single-engined turboprop aircraft
Low-wing aircraft
Aircraft first flown in 2014